WHYS may refer to:

 The Whys, a Japanese surf rock band.
 World: Have Your Say, a current events radio show with a worldwide audience from the BBC World Service
 WHYS-LP, a low-power radio station (96.3 FM) licensed to Eau Claire, Wisconsin, United States